Kelly Adam Asbury (January 15, 1960 – June 26, 2020) was an American animated film director, writer, voice actor, and illustrator. He was best known for directing animated films, including Shrek 2, Spirit: Stallion of the Cimarron, Gnomeo & Juliet, Smurfs: The Lost Village, and UglyDolls.

Early life 
Asbury was born on January 15, 1960 Beaumont, Texas, the son of Josephine Margaret (Lebeouf) and Donald Leslie Asbury. His father Donald died from cancer when Asbury was 12. He attended Lamar University for two years before transferring to the renowned California Institute of the Arts in 1980, where he studied animation and filmmaking.

Career 
Asbury got his start at Walt Disney Feature Animation from 1983 to 1995, and contributed storyboards for several animated films including The Little Mermaid and Beauty and the Beast, as well as Pixar's first feature film, Toy Story. In 1993, he was the assistant art director on Tim Burton's The Nightmare Before Christmas.

In 1995, he began working for DreamWorks Animation, and directed two Academy Award-nominated feature films, Spirit: Stallion of the Cimarron (2002) and Shrek 2 (2004). In addition to directing, he provided some of the extra voices in Shrek 2 and Shrek the Third.

He directed and co-wrote the animated film Gnomeo & Juliet (2011), for which he also provided the voices of the tiny Red Goon Gnomes. He was nominated for two Annie Awards for directing and co-writing that film.

In 2003, he wrote a non-fiction book, Dummy Days, a biography of five 20th-century ventriloquists. He wrote and illustrated twelve children's books, including Rusty's Red Vacation, Bonnie's Blue House, and Yolanda's Yellow School.

In mid-2011 to mid-2012, Asbury briefly returned to Disney to contribute storyboards to Wreck-It Ralph and Frozen. His final directing credits were Smurfs: The Lost Village for Sony Pictures Animation and UglyDolls for STX Entertainment.

Unrealized projects 
Shrek – In 1997, Asbury was tapped to make his directorial debut with a film adaptation of the children's book Shrek! alongside Andrew Adamson. He dropped out a year later in favor of Spirit: Stallion of the Cimarron and was replaced by Vicky Jenson, but remained as a story artist and received special thanks on the finished film. He later co-directed its sequel, Shrek 2.
Pooch Café – In 2011, Asbury was brought in by Sony Pictures Animation to write a new draft for a film adaptation of the Pooch Café comic strip.
Will Gallows and the Snake-Bellied Troll – In 2011, following the success of Gnomeo and Juliet, Asbury was hired by Rocket Pictures to write and direct a live-action/animated film based on the children's book Will Gallows and the Snake-Bellied Troll. The film would've been Asbury's first foray into live-action filmmaking.
Kazorn & The Unicorn – In 2012, Deadline reported that Asbury was in the talks with Sony Pictures Animation to make an animated fantasy film titled Kazorn & The Unicorn. It would have followed the adventures of a young man and a unicorn as he seeks to locate a powerful weapon and prove his worth to his true love. Lloyd Taylor was writing the screenplay. Sam Raimi, Josh Donen, and Russell Hollander were producing the film. Troy Quane (Spies in Disguise, Nimona) was later hired to co-direct the film with Asbury, but the film has since been put on hold.
Horacio 3D – In 2013, Asbury was tapped to write a Brazilian animated film based on the Monica's Gang character Horacio, originally scheduled for a 2017 release. According to animator Fábio Mendes, Asbury was intended to direct the film. But as of 2020, nothing has come from the project.

Death 
Asbury died of abdominal cancer on June 26, 2020, in his home, Encino, Los Angeles, at age 60. He was buried at Forest Lawn Memorial Park, Hollywood Hills. He was featured in the In Memoriam section of the 93rd Academy Awards, and Spirit Untamed was dedicated to his memory.

Filmography

Bibliography

References

External links 
 
Animated Views: Gnomeo & Juliet’s director Kelly Asbury Opens His Secret Garden!
 
 Kelly Asbury at Find a Grave

1960 births
2020 deaths
American animated film directors
American art directors
American male screenwriters
American male voice actors
American storyboard artists
Animators from Texas
Burials at Forest Lawn Memorial Park (Hollywood Hills)
California Institute of the Arts alumni
Deaths from cancer in California
Deaths from stomach cancer
DreamWorks Animation people
Film directors from Texas
Lamar University alumni
People from Beaumont, Texas
Screenwriters from Texas
Sony Pictures Animation people
Walt Disney Animation Studios people